Khanon dok (also spelt khanon htok) is a traditional Burmese snack or mont. The word khanon htok is a portmanteau of Thai khanom and Burmese htok. The snack is essentially a stuffed crepe-like omelette filled with sautéed chicken or shrimp, and rolled like an eggroll.

Khanon dok is a popular delicacy in Mandalay, where it was considered a favorite snack of the Mandalay Palace royals during tea time or supper. A series of Burmese–Siamese wars beginning with Hsinbyushin's reign resulted in the emergence of Thai-inspired delicacies, including khanon dok, shwe yin aye, mont let hsaung, and mont di.

References

Burmese cuisine